Trichophyton terrestre is a fungus of the genus Trichophyton.

History and taxonomy
 first found in County of Cumberland, New South Wales, Australia.
branched under the Trichophyton genus, the fungi was further found to be a complex in its teleomorph stage comprising multiple species, for instance, the Arthroderma insigulare, sp.nov. and Arthroderma olidum sp. nov.
furthermore, the fungi displayed typical feature of Trichonphyton which spread nodules and conidial structures in a spiral fashion. 
with a keratinophilic  and keratinolytic nature, they were often identified on hair cells of mammals and possibly fed on keratin-like substrate.

Growth and morphology
moderate growth speed, yellow colonies

Physiology

Habitat and ecology

References
 

Arthrodermataceae
Fungi described in 1936